Municipalities of Venezuela are subdivisions of the States of Venezuela. There are 335 municipalities dividing the 23 states and the Capital District.

Municipalities and their seats by federal entity

Capital District
Libertador Bolivarian Municipality (Caracas Libertador covers about half of the city of Caracas, officially a metropolitan area; the rest of the city is covered by four adjacent municipalities in Miranda state: Baruta, Chacao, el Hatillo and Sucre)

Amazonas

Anzoátegui

Apure

Aragua

Barinas

Bolívar

Carabobo

Cojedes

Delta Amacuro

Falcón

Guárico

Lara

Mérida

Miranda

Monagas

Nueva Esparta

Portuguesa

Sucre

Táchira

Trujillo

Vargas
Vargas (La Guaira)

Yaracuy

Zulia

 
Venezuela, Municipalities
Subdivisions of Venezuela
Municipalities, Venezuela
Venezuela geography-related lists